"Get Outta My Dreams, Get into My Car" is a song by Trinidadian-British singer Billy Ocean, based on a line in the Sherman Brothers' song "You're Sixteen". It was released as the first single from Ocean's seventh studio album, Tear Down These Walls (1988). Part of its popularity lay in its cutting-edge (for the time) music video, which features animation mixed with live-action sequences. The short saxophone solo is performed by Vernon Jeffrey Smith.

"Get Outta My Dreams" became Ocean's third and final US number-one single, going to number one on both the US Billboard Hot 100 and Hot Black Singles charts. It was also his seventh and most recent single to reach the US top ten. The song also peaked at number one in seven other countries, including Canada, where it was the country's most successful single of 1988, and at number three on the UK Singles Chart, making it Ocean's sixth and final top-10 hit there.

Music video
The accompanying music video for "Get Outta My Dreams, Get into My Car" consists of Billy Ocean driving, sometimes involving scenes with different cartoon characters. It was featured in the 1988 American teen comedy film License to Drive.

Track listings
 12-inch single (BOS T 1)
 "Get Outta My Dreams, Get into My Car" (extended version) – 8:59
 "Get Outta My Dreams, Get into My Car" (7-inch version) – 4:43
 "Showdown" – 4:58

 7-inch single (BOS 1)
 "Get Outta My Dreams, Get into My Car" – 4:10
 "Showdown" – 4:58

 CD maxi-single (BOS CD1)
 "Get Outta My Dreams, Get into My Car" (extended version) – 8:59
 "When the Going Gets Tough, the Tough Get Going" – 4:02
 "Showdown" – 4:58

Charts

Weekly charts

Year-end charts

Certifications

Covers and parodies
The song was later covered by pop punk band Fenix TX for the soundtrack of NASCAR Thunder 2003. In 2013, heavy metal band Gwar covered the song in a video featured on The A.V. Club website as part of the site's A.V. Undercover series. Approximately three minutes into the performance, the band incorporates the Who's "Baba O'Riley" into the song. The song is mentioned in a 2014 television advertisement for Twix Bites.

The song was parodied by comedian and actor Jason Sudeikis as 1980s fake singer Ocean Billy in the Worst of Soul Train sketch on Saturday Night Live with the title "Get Out of My Car, Get into My Trunk". Amazon Prime later included a version with lyrics rewritten and performed by Jon Batiste in an advertisement to promote Prime Day.

In popular culture
The song was featured on the soundtrack of the 1988 film License to Drive. It appears in a 2018 commercial for Applebee's.

References

External links
 

1987 songs
1988 singles
Animated music videos
Billy Ocean songs
Billboard Hot 100 number-one singles
Cashbox number-one singles
Number-one singles in Australia
Number-one singles in Belgium
RPM Top Singles number-one singles
Irish Singles Chart number-one singles
Dutch Top 40 number-one singles
Number-one singles in Norway
Number-one singles in South Africa
Songs written by Robert John "Mutt" Lange
Song recordings produced by Robert John "Mutt" Lange
Songs written by Billy Ocean
Dance-pop songs
Jive Records singles